{{DISPLAYTITLE:Glycerol-3-phosphate dehydrogenase (NAD+)}}

In enzymology, a glycerol-3-phosphate dehydrogenase (NAD+) is an enzyme that catalyzes the chemical reaction

sn-glycerol 3-phosphate + NAD+  glycerone phosphate + NADH + H+

The two substrates of this enzyme are sn-glycerol 3-phosphate and NAD+, whereas its 3 products are glycerone phosphate, NADH, and H+.

This enzyme belongs to the family of oxidoreductases, specifically those acting on the CH-OH group of donor with NAD+ or NADP+ as acceptor. The systematic name of this enzyme class is sn-glycerol-3-phosphate:NAD+ 2-oxidoreductase. Other names in common use include alpha-glycerol phosphate dehydrogenase (NAD+), alpha-glycerophosphate dehydrogenase (NAD+), glycerol 1-phosphate dehydrogenase, glycerol phosphate dehydrogenase (NAD+), glycerophosphate dehydrogenase (NAD+), hydroglycerophosphate dehydrogenase, L-alpha-glycerol phosphate dehydrogenase, L-alpha-glycerophosphate dehydrogenase, L-glycerol phosphate dehydrogenase, L-glycerophosphate dehydrogenase, NAD+-alpha-glycerophosphate dehydrogenase, NAD+-dependent glycerol phosphate dehydrogenase, NAD+-dependent glycerol-3-phosphate dehydrogenase, NAD+-L-glycerol-3-phosphate dehydrogenase, NAD+-linked glycerol 3-phosphate dehydrogenase, NADH-dihydroxyacetone phosphate reductase, and glycerol-3-phosphate dehydrogenase (NAD+). This enzyme participates in glycerophospholipid metabolism.

Structural studies

References

 Boyer, P.D., Lardy, H. and Myrback, K. (Eds.), The Enzymes, 2nd ed., vol. 7, Academic Press, New York, 1963, p. 85-96.
 
 
 
 
 

EC 1.1.1
NADH-dependent enzymes
Enzymes of known structure